Fonzi may refer to:

Surname
 Dolores Fonzi (born 1978), Argentine actress
 Gaeton Fonzi (1935–2012), U.S. journalist
 Giuseppe Fonzi (born 1991), Italian professional cyclist
 Giuseppangelo Fonzi (1768–1840), Italian dentist
 Tomás Fonzi (born 1981), Argentinian actor

First or nickname
 Alan Alda (born 1936; nicknamed "Fonzi"), U.S. actor
 Fonzi Thornton, U.S. singer

See also

 
 Fonzie, "The Fonz", a Happy Days character
 Fonsi (disambiguation)
 Fonzy
 Fozzie
 Fozzy (disambiguation)